Tanju Gürsu (30 October 1938 – 7 June 2016) was a Turkish actor, director and screenwriter, who was a major star of Turkish cinema in the 1960s and 1970s. He appeared in films such as Haremde Dört Kadın (1965) and Üç Korkusuz Arkadaş (1966) under director Halit Refiğ. As director he directed films such as Erkek Kazım (1975) and Kazım'a Bak Kazım'a (1975).

He died of respiratory failure on 7 June 2016 at the age of 77.

Filmography 

 Kırık Kanatlar - 2005 
 Aşkımızda Ölüm Var - 2004 
 Canısı (2) - 1997 
 Böyle mi Olacaktı - 1997 
 Köpekler Adası - 1996 
 Süper Yıldız - 1995 
 Sevmek Ve Ölmek Zamanı - 1989 
 Canım Oğlum - 1988 
 Kurtar Beni - 1987 
 Gülümse Biraz - 1986 
 Mardin-Münih Hattı - 1986 
 Ölüm Yolu - 1985 
 Bir Sevgi İstiyorum - 1984 
 Taçsız Kraliçe - 1984 
 Gülsüm Ana - 1982 
 Boynu Bükük - 1980 
 Tanrıya Feryat - 1980 
 Mücevher Hırsızları - 1979 
 Kara Murat Devler Savaşıyor - 1978 
 Vahşi Gelin - 1978 
 Hedef - 1978 
 Dağılın Kazımlar Geliyor - 1976 
 Kazım'a Ne Lazım - 1975 
 Çirkef - 1975 
 Soysuzlar - 1975 
 Kazım'a Bak Kazım'a - 1975 
 Kokla Beni Melahat - 1975 
 Hop Dedik Kazım - 1974 
 Vurun Kahpeye - 1973 
 Vahşet - 1973 
 Bu Toprağın Kızı - 1973 
 Yalan Dünya - 1972 
 Kırk Yalan Memiş -  1972 
 Aşkların En Güzeli - 1972 
 Çileli Dünya - 1972 
 Kadersizler - 1972 
 Rüzgar Murat - 1971 
 Yalnız Değiliz - 1971 
 Yedi Kocalı Hürmüz - 1971 
 Mazi Kalbimde Yaradır - 1970 
 Ağlayan Melek - 1970 
 Firari Aşıklar - 1970 
 Herkesin Sevgilisi - 1970 
 Sosyete Şakir - 1970 
 Bülbül Yuvası - 1970 
 Gülnaz Sultan - 1969 
 Yarın Başka Bir Gündür - 1969 
 Fakir Kızın Romanı - 1969 
 Ana Kalbi - 1969 
 Yiğit Anadolu'dan Çıkar - 1969 
 Seninle Düştüm Dile - 1969 
 Fosforlu Cevriyem - 1969 
 Buruk Acı - 1969 
 Ağla Gözlerim - 1968 
 Bağdat Hırsızı - 1968 
 Yakılacak Kitap - 1968 
 Malkoçoğlu Kara Korsan - 1968 
 Yalan Yıllar - 1968 
 Beş Asi Adam - 1968 
 Sevmekten Korkuyorum - 1968 
 Kabadayı - 1968 
 Ayşem - 1968 
 Kanun Namına - 1968 
 Bizanslı Zorba - 1967 
 Kara Davut - 1967 
 Devlerin İntikamı - 1967 
 Ölünceye Kadar - 1967 
 Dişi Killing - 1967 
 Elveda - 1967 
 Bir Annenin Gözyaşları - 1967 
 Bırakın Yaşayalım - 1967 
 Yarın Çok Geç Olacak - 1967 
 Çıldırtan Arzu - 1967 
 Deli Fişek - 1967 
 Parmaklıklar Arkasında - 1967 
 Arzunun Bedeli - 1966 
 Kadın Avcılar - 1966 
 Üç Korkusuz Arkadaş - 1966 
 Bu Şehrin Belalısı - 1966 
 Yemin Ettim Bir Kere - 1966 
 Can Yoldaşları - 1966 
 Mezarını Hazırla - 1966 
 Sarı Gül - 1966 
 Silahlar Patlayınca - 1966 
 Ölmeyen Aşk - 1966 
 Altın Şehir - 1965 
 Ateş Gibi Kadın - 1965 
 Canın Cehenneme - 1965 
 Cumartesi Senin Pazar Benim - 1965 
 Hak Yolunda - 1965 
 Haremde Dört Kadın - 1965 
 Lafını Balla Kestim - 1965 
 On Korkusuz Kadın - 1965 
 Bitmeyen Kavga - 1965 
 Tatlı Yumruk - 1965 
 Çiçekçi Kız - 1965 
 Ankara'ya Üç Bilet - 1964 
 Keşanlı - 1964 
 Korkunç Şüphe - 1964 
 Paylaşılmayan Sevgili - 1964 
 Sen Vur Ben Kırayım - 1964 
 Sokakların Kanunu - 1964 
 Tığ Gibi Delikanlı - 1964 
 Kara Memed - 1964 
 Çanakkale Aslanları - 1964 
 Köye Giden Gelin - 1964 
 Galatalı Fatma  - 1964 
 Adalardan Bir Yar Gelir Bizlere - 1964 
 Hızlı Osman - 1964 
 Kara Dağlı Efe - 1964 
 Sahte Sevgili - 1964 
 Kaynana Zırıltısı - 1964 
 Duvarların Ötesi - 1964 
 Gurbet Kuşları - 1964 
 İki Kocalı Kadın - 1963 
 Bütün Suçumuz Sevmek - 1963 
 Üç Öfkeli Genç - 1963 
 Ölüme Çeyrek Var - 1963 
 Ölüm Pazarı - 1963 
 Arka Sokaklar - 1963 
 Lekeli Kadın - 1962 
 Fosforlu Oyuna Gelmez - 1962 
 Ver Elini İstanbul - 1962 
 Hodri Meydan - 1962 
 Şehvet Uçurumu - 1962

References

External links 

1938 births
2016 deaths
Turkish male film actors
Turkish film directors
Turkish male screenwriters
People from Trabzon
Deaths from respiratory failure
Burials at Zincirlikuyu Cemetery